Vanderson is a given name. Notable people with the name include:

 Vanderson Válter de Almeida (born 1978), Brazilian footballer
 Vanderson da Silva Souza (born 1986), Brazilian footballer
 Vanderson Stolk Francisco (born 1987), Brazilian footballer
 Vanderson (footballer, born 2001), Brazilian fullback